Vukol Mikhaylovich Lavrov (23 September 1852 — 23 January 1912) was a Russian journalist, publisher, editor and translator.

In 1880 he started to publish Russkaya Mysl (which is seen in retrospect as having provided an ideological background for the Russian Constitutional Democrat Party) and in 1882 became its editor-in-chief. Lavrov was considered Russia's best translator from Polish of his time. Among the translations he's made were the novels by Henryk Sienkiewicz, Zygmunt Miłkowski, Eliza Orzeszkowa, Maria Konopnicka and Władysław Reymont.

References 

1852 births
1912 deaths
Writers from Yelets
People from Yeletsky Uyezd
Editors from the Russian Empire
Journalists from the Russian Empire
Translators from the Russian Empire
19th-century translators from the Russian Empire
Burials at Vagankovo Cemetery